Novogeorgiyevka is a rural locality (a selo) and the administrative center of  Novogeorgiyevsky Selsoviet, Tarumovsky District, Republic of Dagestan, Russia. The population was 2,379 as of 2010. There are 19 streets.

Geography 
Novogeorgiyevka is located 20 km south of Tarumovka (the district's administrative centre) by road. Bondarenovskoye is the nearest rural locality.

References 

Rural localities in Tarumovsky District